The 2009 Conference USA football season was the 15th season of the conference's existence.

Previous season
East Carolina won the conference championship.

Rankings

C-USA vs. BCS matchups

Regular season

Week one

Week two

Week three

Week four

Week five

Week six

Week seven

Players of the week

References